Mirzapur is a village in Parbhani taluka of Parbhani district of Maharashtra state in India.

Demography
According to the 2011 census of India, Mirzapur had a population of 751, of which 395 were male and 356 were female. The average sex ratio of the village was 901, which was lower than the Maharashtra state average of 929. The literacy rate was 72.84% compared to 82.3% for the state. Male literacy rate was 83% while female literacy rate was 61%.

Geography and Transport
Following table shows distance of Mirzapur from some of major cities.

References

Villages in Parbhani district